Buck Rogers in the 25th Century was a radio drama series based on the popularity of the popular novel and comics series Buck Rogers. It aired from 1932-1936, 1939, 1940 and 1946-1947, and it was notable for being the first science fiction radio show.

Broadcasting history

Buck Rogers was initially broadcast as a 15-minute show on CBS Radio, from Monday through Thursday. It first ran from November 7, 1932, until May 22, 1936 . In 1936, it moved to a Monday, Wednesday, Friday schedule and went off the air the same year (720 episodes, 180 hours). Mutual Broadcasting System brought the show back and broadcast it three days a week from April 5 to July 31, 1939 (51 episodes, 12.75 hours), and from May 18 to July 27, 1940, a 30-minute version was broadcast on Saturdays (11 episodes, 5.5 hours). From September 30, 1946, to March 28, 1947, Mutual aired a 15-minute version on weekdays (78 episodes 19.5 hours).

The show was directed by Carlo De Angelo and Jack Johnstone. De Angelo also produced it. Sound effects were provided by Ora Daigle Nichols. In 1988, Johnstone recalled how he worked with the sound effects of Ora Nichols to produce the sound of the rockets by using an air-conditioning vent. Dick Calkins, who also made the comic strip, wrote the scripts.

Actors Matt Crowley, Curtis Arnall, Carl Frank and John Larkin all voiced Buck Rogers at various times. Wilma Deering was portrayed by Adele Ronson, and the brilliant scientist-inventor Dr. Huer was played by Edgar Stehli.

Cast
 Buck Rogers: Matt Crowley, Curtis Arnall, Carl Frank, John Larkin.
 Wilma Deering: Adele Ronson
 Dr. Huer: Edgar Stehli
 Black Barney: Jack Roseleigh, Joe Granby
 Buddy: Ronald Liss
 Ardala Valmar: Elaine Melchior
 Killer Kane: William "Bill" Shelley, Dan Ocko, Arthur Vinton.

Sources

Radio
American radio dramas
American children's radio programs
American science fiction radio programs
Aviation radio series
CBS Radio programs
Mutual Broadcasting System programs
1932 radio programme debuts
1936 radio programme endings
1939 radio programme debuts
1939 radio programme endings
1940 radio programme debuts
1940 radio programme endings
1946 radio programme debuts
1947 radio programme endings
Radio programmes based on novels
Radio programs based on comic strips